Afterlife is a god game released by LucasArts in July 1996 that places the player in the role of a semi-omnipotent being known as a Demiurge, with the job of creating a functional Heaven and Hell to reward or punish the citizens of the local planet. The player does not assign citizens to their various punishments and rewards since the game does this automatically. Instead, the player creates the infrastructure (roads, zones for the various sins/virtues, reincarnation centers) that allows the afterlife to function properly. Players are accountable for the job that they do because of their bosses, The Powers That Be, check in from time to time. The player also has the assistance of two advisors—Aria Goodhalo, an angel, and Jasper Wormsworth, a demon. Aria and Jasper provide warnings when things are going wrong with the afterlife, and offer tips on how to fix the problems.

The game is very satirical, with various references to pop culture (such as a passing mention of a "San Quentin Scarearantino" or sending a Death Star to destroy buildings if the player cheats too much).

Gameplay
The primary goal of the game is to provide divine and infernal services for the inhabitants of the afterlife. This afterlife caters to one particular planet, known simply as the Planet. The creatures living on the Planet are called EMBOs, or Ethically Mature Biological Organisms. When an EMBO dies, its soul travels to the afterlife where it attempts to find an appropriate "fate structure". Fate structures are places where souls are rewarded or punished, as appropriate, for the virtues or sins that they practiced while they were alive.

While the seven sins are based on the seven deadly sins, only two of the seven virtues correspond to the seven heavenly virtues.

Alternatively, players can choose to lay down generic zones for fate structures, that can house all souls of all types easily.  However, these structures do not support as much population or are as effective as the single virtues/sins, and are more of a short-term solution for lost souls who cannot find a reward/punishment.

The paths that souls take through the afterlife depend largely on the tenets of the souls' belief systems. Depending on these tenets, a soul may visit a single fate structure or it may be rewarded/punished for multiple sins or virtues. Tenets also determine whether a soul will visit only Heaven, only Hell, or both, as well as whether that soul will reincarnate after it has received its final reward or punishment.

The player can view of the current distribution of sins and virtues on the Planet, as well as the percentages of EMBOs who believe in each of the tenets. The player may spend a considerable amount of money to influence an important EMBO on the Planet. This influence can cause the EMBO to adopt one or more of the sins or virtues, as well as persuade him or her to believe in the tenet or tenets selected. This EMBO will then spread their newfound ideals, which will cause a shift in the beliefs and sins/virtues in the surrounding area.

At the start of the game, the EMBOs on the planet will be at the lowest level of technology, which is fire. As the game progresses, new technologies are discovered, ranging from pottery to medicine to aviation. New technologies help the EMBOs to become more widespread on the planet, which means a larger population for the afterlife when they die. The development of new technologies can be assisted by wielding influence on an EMBO artist or inventor in the same way that EMBOs are persuaded to new tenets or sins and virtues.

Most buildings in the afterlife produce Vibes, which are a measure of how buildings affect one another. Buildings can either produce "good vibes" or "bad vibes". Fate structures need to be under the appropriate type of vibe (good in Heaven, bad in Hell) in order to evolve into larger and more efficient structures.

As Demiurge, the player receives a yearly paycheque from The Powers That Be. The amount received is based on a number of factors, such as the number of souls that passed through the gates of the afterlife in that year.

The player's afterlife is staffed by angels (in Heaven) and demons (in Hell). At first, all workers are imported and must commute from other afterlives, which quickly becomes expensive. The costs can be lowered by building Topias to house workers in the player's afterlife, making the commute unnecessary. Employment costs can be further reduced by building training centers, which train processed souls to become angels and demons.

Balance can be done in two ways. The first, the Micromanager, allows the player to browse a specific structure and adjust its balance level for free unless the player decides to lock the structure, in which case a maintenance fee is charged yearly.  The balance level is measured in a grayscale bar, with the two extremes dedicating to research (permanent souls) or production (temporary souls). The Macromanager, on the other hand, allows the player to balance manually or automatically all fate structures of a specific virtue/sin simultaneously.

"Bad Things", which are akin to natural disasters, occur at random. Each one can be repelled by one of the Special Buildings that are granted as rewards for reaching population milestones. Bad Things can be disabled via an in-game menu. However, doing so decreases the player's soul rate by half.

Like most god games, Afterlife is open-ended and does not have set conditions for winning. There are, however, a few definite ways of losing the game. These include having an excessive number of unemployed workers (leading to an all-out war between Heaven and Hell), staying too deep in debt for too long, and the Planet's population being wiped out by either nuclear warfare or an asteroid event.

Development
Lead designer Michael Stemmle said the idea for the game came as he played SimCity, combined with a fascination for creating an organized afterlife "that tickled my bone ever since I read Dante's Inferno".  In what he attributed to LucasArts being "a rather experimental studio at the time", his pitch was approved and a team of 20 people would then work on the game. Stemmle wanted in particular to go "whole hog goofy" by not having a setting trapped to reality, full of satirical descriptions and pun-based names. He found Hell to be easier to design, as "ironic punishments are dime a dozen", leading him to find Heaven more creatively rewarding.

Reception

The game received "favorable" reviews according to the review aggregation website GameRankings. A Next Generation critic called Afterlife "a title that will immediately attract anyone who was even mildly amused by the mother of all sim-builders, SimCity", and praised the vast number of options and responsibilities, the characters, and the complex government. They also made similar praises of the PC version, but with a lower score.

Macworld gave Afterlife its 1996 "Best Simulation Game" award.

References

External links

1996 video games
DOS games
Windows games
Classic Mac OS games
LucasArts games
God games
City-building games
Video games about angels
Video games about death
Video games about demons
Video games about the afterlife
Video games developed in the United States
Video games scored by Peter McConnell
Video games set in hell
Video games with isometric graphics
Games commercially released with DOSBox
Single-player video games
Seven deadly sins in popular culture